The El Picacho Formation is a geological formation in Texas, United States, whose strata date back to the Late Cretaceous. Dinosaur remains are among the fossils that have been recovered from the formation. The paleosols found here are rich in clay, calcite, and rhizoliths which show that during the Cretaceous period, this fossil formation, just like the neighboring Javelina Formation and Aguja Formation, was a fluvial flood plain.

Vertebrate paleofauna
 Alamosaurus sanjuanensis 
 Chasmosaurinae indterminate.
 Gryposaurus sp. (possibly Kritosaurus) 
 Kritosaurus navajovius
 Nodosauridae indterminate. 
 Tyrannosauridae indterminate. 
 Ornithomimidae indterminate.

See also

 List of dinosaur-bearing rock formations

References

Cretaceous geology of Texas
Maastrichtian Stage of North America